The 2016 Italian motorcycle Grand Prix was the sixth round of the 2016 Grand Prix motorcycle racing season. It was held at the Mugello Circuit in Scarperia on 22 May 2016. The MotoGP race was settled by a mere 0.019 seconds as Jorge Lorenzo pulled out of Marc Márquez' slipstream on the final straight on the final lap after a dramatic duel between the two, whilst polesitter Valentino Rossi lost a chance at challenging for a home win due to an engine failure. This race marks Rossi's first bike failure since the 2007 San Marino Grand Prix.

This race was the last race for Luis Salom before he was fatally injured after an accident during practice session at the following Grand Prix in Barcelona.

In the Moto3 class, Fabio Di Giannantonio took his first podium in what was just his 7th start.

Classification

MotoGP

 Tito Rabat crashed in Free Practice 3 and suffered a broken collarbone.

Moto2
The race, scheduled to be run for 21 laps, was red-flagged after Xavi Vierge crashed causing damage to an airfence and was later restarted over 10 laps.

Moto3

 Davide Pizzoli withdrew after Free Practice 2 with a recurring ankle injury.

Championship standings after the race (MotoGP)
Below are the standings for the top five riders and constructors after round six has concluded.

Riders' Championship standings

Constructors' Championship standings

 Note: Only the top five positions are included for both sets of standings.

References

Italian
Motorcycle Grand Prix
Italian motorcycle Grand Prix
Italian